This list contains all cultural property of national significance (class A) in the canton of Vaud from the 2009 Swiss Inventory of Cultural Property of National and Regional Significance. It is sorted by municipality and contains 186 individual buildings, 46 collections, 32 archaeological finds and 2 other, special sites or objects.

The geographic coordinates provided are in the Swiss coordinate system as given in the Inventory.

Agiez

Aigle

Allaman

Arnex-sur-Orbe

Arzier

Aubonne

Avenches

Baulmes

Begnins

Bex

Blonay

Bofflens

Bonvillars

Bougy-Villars

Bourg-en-Lavaux

Bursinel

Bursins

Burtigny

Champagne

Champvent

Chardonne

Château-d'Œx

Chavannes-le-Chêne

Chavannes-le-Veyron

Chavannes-près-Renens

Chavannes-sur-Moudon

Chavornay

Chêne-Pâquier

Cheseaux-Noréaz

Chéserex

Chexbres

Concise

Coppet

Corcelles-près-Concise

Corseaux

Corsier-sur-Vevey

Cossonay

Crans-près-Céligny

Cronay

Cuarnens

Cudrefin

Curtilles

Daillens

Démoret

Donneloye

Duillier

Dully

Echichens

Eclépens

Écublens

Essertines-sur-Rolle

Essertines-sur-Yverdon

Etoy

Faoug

Féchy

Ferreyres

Fiez

Fontaines-sur-Grandson

Giez

Gilly

Gimel

Givrins

Gland

Grandcour

Grandson

Gressy

Gryon

Hautemorges

Jongny

Jorat-Mézières

Jouxtens-Mézery

L'Abbaye

La Sarraz

La Tour-de-Peilz

Lausanne

Lavigny

Le Chenit

Le Lieu

Les Clées

Les Tavernes

Leysin

Lignerolle

L'Isle

Lonay

Lovatens

Lucens

Luins

Lutry

Maracon

Marchissy

Mathod

Mex

Mollens

Molondin

Montanaire

Montcherand

Mont-la-Ville

Montreux

Mont-sur-Rolle

Morges

Moudon

Novalles

Noville

Nyon

Ogens

Ollon

Onnens

Orbe

Ormont-Dessous

Ormont-Dessus

Orny

Oron

Payerne

Penthaz

Perroy

Prangins

Provence

Puidoux

Pully

Rances

Rivaz

Rolle

Romainmôtier-Envy

Rossinière

Rougemont

Saint-George

Saint-Légier-La Chiésaz

Saint-Livres

Saint-Prex

Saint-Saphorin (Lavaux)

Saint-Sulpice

Sainte-Croix

Sergey

Sottens

Tartegnin

Tévenon

Trey

Treytorrens

Ursins

Valbroye

Valeyres-sous-Rances

Vallorbe

Vaulion

Vevey

Veytaux

Villarzel

Villeneuve

Vinzel

Vufflens-la-Ville

Vufflens-le-Château

Vullierens

Vully-les-Lacs

Yens

Yverdon-les-Bains

See also 
List of cultural property of regional significance in Switzerland: Vaud

References
 All entries, addresses and coordinates are from:

External links
 Swiss Inventory of Cultural Property of National and Regional Significance, 2009 edition:

PDF documents: Class B objects
Geographic information system

Canton of Vaud
 01
Buildings and structures in the canton of Vaud
Tourist attractions in the canton of Vaud